Ajani Russell is an American skateboarder, actress, and model. Russell is best known for playing Indigo in the 2018 film Skate Kitchen, and currently plays Indigo in the 2020 HBO television series adaptation Betty.

References

External links
 

American skateboarders
Female skateboarders
Living people
African-American skateboarders
African-American actresses
Year of birth missing (living people)
21st-century African-American people
21st-century African-American women